The 2014 Deutschland Cup was the 25th edition of the tournament.

Teams

Standings

Results

External links
Official website

2014
2014–15 in Canadian ice hockey
2014–15 in German ice hockey
2014–15 in Swiss ice hockey
2014–15 in Slovak ice hockey